Woodhull Lake is a lake located near the town of Ohio, New York. The outlet of the lake flows into Sand Lake which flows into Woodhull Creek. Fish species that are present in the lake are brook trout, lake trout, splake, white sucker, bullhead, and yellow perch.

References 

Lakes of Herkimer County, New York